Mercedes Delpino (February 19, 1898 – May 12, 1965) was an American dancer and comedian, born in Puerto Rico. She was half of a successful vaudeville and burlesque comedy act in the 1920s with Bert Lahr, who was also her husband.

Early life 
Delpino was born in San Juan, Puerto Rico and raised in New York City.

Career 
Delpino was a chorus girl, comedian, and dancer, touring the United States and Canada on the vaudeville and burlesque stages in the 1920s. She was described as "one of the most beautiful women on vaudeville... dark and alluring". She shared an "ultra smart" comedy act with comedian Bert Lahr, usually billed as "Lahr & Mercedes". They were on Broadway together in Harry Delmar's Revels in 1927; by then, bouts of mental instability were beginning to affect her work, and she left the stage while Lahr continued to greater success.

In 1997, archival footage of Mercedes Delpino Lahr appeared in a documentary about vaudeville, part of the American Masters series on PBS.

Personal life and legacy 
Delpino and Lahr had a son together, Herbert E. Lahr, in 1928. They were married until 1939, when the marriage was annulled on the basis of her longterm chronic mental illness, so that he was able to remarry. She was institutionalized, and later lived in her sister Isabel's home. She died at home in 1965, aged 67 years, in Tucson, Arizona. The play Max and Maxie by James McLure is a fictionalized account of her life with Lahr; the Maxie character, based on Delpino, was played by Sandy Roveta in the show's 1989 New York run.

References

External links 

 
A 1925 cartoon by Fred Morgan, depicting Lahr & Mercedes, in the Vaudeville Nation collection of the New York Public Library for the Performing Arts

1898 births
1965 deaths
People from San Juan, Puerto Rico
Vaudeville performers
Burlesque performers
American women comedians
20th-century American dancers
Puerto Rican dancers
Puerto Rican comedians
20th-century American comedians
Comedians from New York City
Dancers from New York (state)